John Christopher "Aidan" Nichols  (born 17 September 1948) is an English academic and Catholic priest.

Nichols served as the first John Paul II Memorial Visiting Lecturer at the University of Oxford for 2006 to 2008, the first lectureship of Catholic theology at that university since the Protestant Reformation. He is a member of the Order of Preachers (Dominicans) residing in the Priory of St Michael the Archangel in Cambridge, England.

Early life
Nichols was born in Lytham St Annes, Lancashire, on 17 September 1948. He graduated with first-class honours from Christ Church, Oxford, with a degree in modern history.

Religious life
Nichols entered the Dominican Order in 1970. He spent the next seven years at Blackfriars, Oxford, during which time he was ordained to the priesthood. He then moved to Edinburgh, where he served as a chaplain at the University of Edinburgh. He received his doctorate at Edinburgh in 1986. Between 1983 and 1991, Nichols was Lecturer in Dogmatics and Ecumenics at the Pontifical University of St. Thomas Aquinas  in Rome. In 1990 he was awarded the degree of Licentiate of Sacred Theology from the university. In 2003, the master of the Dominican Order conferred on Nichols the degree of Master of Sacred Theology.

From Rome. Nichols moved back to England and to Cambridge, where he began as assistant Catholic chaplain, then as an affiliated university lecturer (1998) as prior of St Michael's for two terms between 1998 and 2004, and again for a third term from 2013.

Academic work 
Nichols began his academic work in the Russian theological tradition and has written on many figures, including Sergei Bulgakov. However he is best known for his work on Hans Urs von Balthasar, publishing three analytic volumes on von Balthasar's famous trilogy: The Word Has Been Abroad: A Guide Through Balthasar's Aesthetics (1998), No Bloodless Myth: A Guide Through Balthasar’s Dramatics (2000) and Say It Is Pentecost: A Guide Through Balthasar’s Logic (2001). He was also one of the contributors to the Cambridge Companion to Hans Urs von Balthasar (2004). He has also written The Theology of Joseph Ratzinger (1988), a book on the theological history of Anglicanism in The Panther and the Hind (1992) and a more general work on religion in the modern world, Christendom Awake (1993).

In April 2019, Nichols was among nineteen Catholic scholars and clergy who signed a 20-page open letter to the bishops of the world accusing Pope Francis of heresy.

Selected books
 (2020) Balthasar for Thomists
 (2019) Conciliar Octet: A Concise Commentary on the Eight Key Texts of the Second Vatican Council
 (2016) All Great Art is Praise: Art and Religion in John Ruskin
 (2015) There Is No Rose: The Mariology of the Catholic Church
 (2013) Figuring out the Church: Her Marks, and Her Masters
 (2012) Chalice of God. A Systematic Theology in Outline
 (2011) The Latin Clerk. The Life, Work, and Travels of Adrian Fortescue
 (2011) Lost in Wonder. Essays on Liturgy and the Arts
 (2011) The Poet as Believer. A Theological Study of Paul Claudel
 (2011) A Key to Balthasar. Hans Urs von Balthasar on Beauty, Goodness, and Truth
 (2010) Criticising the Critics. Catholic Apologias for Today
 (2010) Romance and System. The Theological Synthesis of Matthias Joseph Scheeben
 (2009) From Hermes to Benedict XVI. Faith and Reason in Modern Catholic Thought
 (2009) G. K. Chesterton, Theologian
 (2008) The Realm. An Unfashionable Essay on the Conversion of England
 (2008) Reason with Piety. Garrigou-Lagrange in the Service of Catholic Thought
 (2007) Redeeming Beauty. Essays on Sacral Aesthetics
 (2007) Lovely, like Jerusalem. The Fulfilment of the Old Testament in Christ and the Church
 (2007) Divine Fruitfulness: A Guide to Balthasar's Theology beyond the Trilogy Catholic University of America Press
 (2007) Redeeming Beauty: Soundings in Sacral Aesthetics
 (2007) The Thought of Pope Benedict XVI: An Introduction to the Theology of Joseph Ratzinger
 (2006) Scattering the Seed: A Guide Through Balthasar's Early Writings on Philosophy And the Arts Catholic University of America Press
 (2003) A Spirituality for the Twenty First Century
 (2002) Epiphany: A Theological Introduction to Catholicism
 (2002) Discovering Aquinas: An Introduction to His Life, Work and Influence
 (2002) Beyond the Blue Glass: Catholic Essays on Faith and Culture
 (2002) A Pope and a Council on the Sacred Liturgy: Pope Pius Xii's Mediator Dei and the Second Vatican Council's Sacrosanctum Concilium With a Comparative Study a Tale of Two Documents
 (2001) Pentecost: A Guide Through Balthasar's Logic
 (2000) No Bloodless Myth: A Guide Through Balthasar's Dramatics Catholic University of America Press
 (2000) Christendom Awake: On Re-Energising the Church in Culture
 (1998) The Word Has Been Abroad: A Guide Through Balthasar's Aesthetics Catholic University of America Press
 (1997) The Service of Glory: The Catechism of the Catholic Church on Worship, Ethics, Spirituality
 (1996) Looking at the Liturgy: A Critical View of Its Contemporary Form
 (1995) The Splendour of Doctrine: The Catechism of the Catholic Church on Christian Believing
 (1994) Byzantine Gospel: Maximus the Confessor in Modern Scholarship
 (1992) Rome and the Eastern Churches: A Study in Schism
 (1992) The Panther and the Hind: A Theological History of Anglicanism
 (1991) Holy Order: The Apostolic Ministry from the New Testament to the Second Vatican Council
 (1991) The Shape of Catholic Theology: An Introduction to Its Sources, Principles, and History
 (1991) The Holy Eucharist: From the New Testament to Pope John Paul II
 (1991) A Grammar of Consent: The Existence of God in Christian Tradition
 (1990) From Newman to Congar: The Idea of Doctrinal Development from the Victorians to the Second Vatican Council
 (1990) Theology in the Russian Diaspora: Church, Fathers, Eucharist in Nikolai Afanas'ev (1893–1966)
 (1989) Yves Congar
 (1988) The Theology of Joseph Ratzinger: An Introductory Study
 (1980) The Art of God Incarnate: Theology and Image in Christian Tradition

References

External links 

 Blackfriars, Cambridge
 Christendom Awake website
 Interview with Touchstone magazine
 Sermons by Aidan Nichols at Torch

1948 births
Living people
20th-century English Roman Catholic priests
21st-century English Roman Catholic priests
Alumni of Christ Church, Oxford
Alumni of the University of Edinburgh
English Dominicans
20th-century British Roman Catholic theologians
Alumni of Blackfriars, Oxford
Academic staff of the Pontifical University of Saint Thomas Aquinas
Academics of the University of Cambridge
Dominican theologians
21st-century British Roman Catholic theologians